"Days"/"Green" is the forty-fourth single (forty-fifth overall) by the Japanese singer Ayumi Hamasaki, released on December 17, 2008. In addition to the A-sides "Days" and "Green", the single contains re-recorded versions of Hamasaki's songs "Love: Destiny" and "To Be". The single was Hamasaki's 31st single to reach number one on the Oricon chart and 19th consecutive single to do so.

The single is certified gold for shipment of 100,000 copies.

Release and packaging
"Green", one of the A-sides from the single, was released through online music store Dwango and Recochoku. It was also used in an advertisement for Panasonic. This single was released in two versions: "Days/Green" contains an updated "Love: Destiny". "Green/Days" contains an updated "To Be". Besides the B-sides, there is no difference in the two versions of the CDs other than the track order. However, the DVD of "Days/Green" contains the making of shot of the "Days" video, and the DVD of "Green/Days" contains the making of shot of the Green PV.  Each version of the single was released in CD+DVD and CD-only formats, both having slightly different cover jackets. The first press of the two CD+DVD versions was packaged in a vertically long casing, similar to the first press editions of Ayumi Hamasaki's previous single "Mirrorcle World". Some online retailers included a B2 size poster of the "Days/Green" CD+DVD cover for all versions of the single.

Commercial and promotional videos

The music videos for "Green"  and "Days" were shot during a tour stop in Shanghai, China.

Green premiered on November 26, 2008 on MTV Japan. The music video depicts Hamasaki as a nightclub singer in 1930s Shanghai, styled after the Ang Lee film Lust, Caution.  The video reportedly costs $1,600,000 and is directed by Kazuyoshi Shimomura. In the video, Ayumi rushes to a cabaret where she performs. As she is performing, a woman (Played by Saito Midori) is enticed by her presence. Later on, the woman finally dances with her.

Days was Hamasaki's first music video to be shot in anamorphic 16:9 widescreen. Retailer Peach John sold a limited-edition replica of the outfit Hamasaki wore in the "Days" music video. The music video premiered December 3, 2008. The music video is set in a ghetto and she plays a sweet girl who gets woken by her boyfriend"s motorcycle, Ayumi goes downstairs and her boyfriend gives her a helmet, she then goes out with her boyfriend and she sees a ring she wants and starts asking her boyfriend, but he rejects. She is also trying to get his attention at his Dance classes, but he ignores. It goes back to the scene where she gets woken up by the motorcycle, Ayumi goes downstairs and greets her boyfriend, but he gives a helmet to another woman who is wearing the ring she wanted. She walks away, heartbroken and her friends come to Ayumi and the video ends. Scenes of Ayumi in a basement were also shown throughout the music video.

Track listing

Live performances
December 3, 2008 - FNS (Days)
December 5, 2008 - Music Station (Days)
December 16, 2008 - Best Artist 2008 (Days)
December 23, 2008 - Happy Xmas Show!! (evolution and Days)

Charts

Oricon Sales Chart

Billboard Japan

Digital Sales Charts

See also
List of most expensive music videos

References

Avex

2008 songs
Ayumi Hamasaki songs
Oricon Weekly number-one singles
Billboard Japan Hot 100 number-one singles
Songs written by Ayumi Hamasaki
Songs written by Tsunku